Louis Denis-Valvérane (20 September 1870 – 11 April 1943) was a French painter. His work was part of the art competitions at the 1928 Summer Olympics and the 1932 Summer Olympics.

References

1870 births
1943 deaths
20th-century French painters
20th-century French male artists
French male painters
Olympic competitors in art competitions
People from Manosque
19th-century French male artists